Lege mou "S' agapo" (Greek: Λέγε μου "Σ' αγαπώ"; Keep telling me "I love you") is a studio album by popular Greek singer Marinella. It was released in December 1990 in Greece and Cyprus by Minos EMI. All music and lyrics are by Takis Mousafiris. This album was issued in mono and stereo. The stereo version of this album was released on CD in the same year by Minos EMI.

Track listing 
Side One.
 "Thelo na t' akouo (Lege mou “S' agapo")" (Θέλω να τ' ακούω; I want to hear it) – 2:53
 "Enas filos" (Ένας φίλος; A friend) – 3:54
 "Den thelo pia na me thimase" (Δεν θέλω πια να με θυμάσαι; I don't want you to remember me anymore) – 2:45
 "Arki na 'rthis" (Αρκεί να 'ρθεις; It's enough to come) – 3:26
 "Matia gemata “S' agapo"" (Μάτια γεμάτα “Σ' αγαπώ"; Eyes full of "I love you") – 3:17
 "I agapi ine polemos" (Η αγάπη είναι πόλεμος; Love is war) – 4:22
Side Two.
 "Ki esy mou les “Den ksero"" (Κι εσύ μου λες “Δεν ξέρω"; And you're telling me "I don't know") – 2:52
 "Prota ap' ola ego" (Πρώτα απ' όλα εγώ; First of all, myself) – 3:02
 "Sto gyrou tou thanatou" (Στο γύρου του θανάτου; In the round of death) – 2:56
 "Thimase" (Θυμάσαι; Do you remember?) feat. Dimitris Kokotas  – 3:21
 "Olo avrio" (Όλο αύριο; Constantly, tomorrow) – 3:35

Personnel 
 Marinella – vocals, background vocals
 Dimitris Kokotas, Irene Ragkou, Anna Zisi, Argiris Koukas – background vocals
 Achilleas Theofilou – producer 
 Takis Mousafiris – arranger, conductor
 Yiannis Smyrneos – recording engineer
 Dinos Diamantopoulos – photographer
 Achilleas Haritos – make-up artist
 Dimitris Souleles – hair stylist

References

1990 albums
Greek-language albums
Marinella albums
Minos EMI albums